Tukhchar (Bilt-Evla) is a rural locality (a selo) in Novolaksky District, Republic of Dagestan, Russia. The population was 3,567 as of 2010. There are 105 streets.

Geography 
Tukhchar is located 18 km southwest of Khasavyurt, on the right bank of the Aksay River. Ishkhoy and Gerzel-Aul are the nearest rural localities.

Ethnicities 
Chechens, Avars and Laks live there.

See also 
 Tukhchar massacre

References 

Rural localities in Novolaksky District